Felix Mendelssohn wrote thirteen string symphonies between 1821 and 1823, when he was between 12 and 14 years old. (For his mature symphonies, see here). These symphonies were tributes to Classical symphonies especially by Joseph Haydn, Johann Christian Bach, Carl Philipp Emanuel Bach, and Wolfgang Amadeus Mozart.

Instrumentation

The symphonies are written for a string orchestra. String Symphony No. 11 also contains percussion (timpani, triangle, cymbals) in the second movement. No. 8 exists in two forms: the original for string orchestra, and an arrangement that Mendelssohn wrote that added woodwinds, brass, and timpani. The work is scored for two flutes, two oboes, two clarinets, two bassoons, two horns, two trumpets, timpani in D and A, and strings. (A typical performance lasts half an hour).

Structure

Most of the string symphonies were composed in three movements, with the exceptions of nos. 7, 8 and 9, which are in four movements, nos. 10 and 13 which are in one movement, and no. 11 which is in five movements.

Symphonies

No. 1 in C major

 Allegro
 Andante
 Allegro

No. 2 in D major

 Allegro
 Andante
 Allegro vivace

No. 3 in E minor

 Allegro di molto
 Andante
 Allegro

No. 4 in C minor

 Grave – Allegro
 Andante
 Allegro vivace

No. 5 in B-flat major

 Allegro vivace
 Andante
 Presto

No. 6 in E-flat major

 Allegro
 Menuetto
 Prestissimo

No. 7 in D minor

 Allegro
 Andante amorevole
 Menuetto
 Allegro molto

No. 8 in D major

 Adagio e grave – Allegro
 Adagio
 Menuetto
 Allegro molto

No. 9 in C major

 Grave – Allegro
 Andante
 Scherzo
 Allegro vivace

No. 10 in B minor

 Adagio – Allegro – Piu presto

No. 11 in F major

 Adagio – Allegro molto
 Scherzo comodo. 
 Adagio
 Menuetto: Allegro moderato
 Allegro molto

No. 12 in G minor

 Fuga: Grave – Allegro
 Andante
 Allegro molto

No. 13 Symphoniesatz

Mendelssohn sketched out a 13th string symphony, called  ("symphonic movement"). This Grave – Allegro molto is in C minor.

References

External links

Lists of symphonies by composer
 
Symphonies for string orchestra
String symphonies
1821 compositions
1822 compositions
1823 compositions